Daniel Nelson may refer to:
Dan Nelson (born 1976), American singer-songwriter
Daniel Nelson, founder of Nelsonville, Ohio (1817)
Daniel Nelson (Swedish composer) (born 1965)